Army Reserve Command may refer to:

 United States Army Reserve Command (United States of America)
 Philippine Army Reserve Command (Philippines)
 Army Reserve Command (Thailand), now  known as the Territorial Defense Command